Ivona Turčinović (born 17 March 1991) is a Montenegrin footballer who plays as a midfielder. She has been a member of the Montenegro women's national team.

References

1991 births
Living people
Women's association football midfielders
Montenegrin women's footballers
Montenegro women's international footballers
ŽFK Ekonomist players